Waiwai  (Uaiuai, Uaieue, Ouayeone) is a Cariban language of northern Brazil, with a couple hundred speakers across the border in southern Guyana and Suriname.

Phonology

Consonants

Vowels 

 /o/ can be heard as [ʌ] when following palatal consonants /tʃ, ʃ/.
 /a/ can be heard as [æ] when preceded by sounds /j, tʃ/, and followed by sounds /w, m, s/.

References

External links

Waiwai Collection of Niels Fock from the Archive of the Indigenous Languages of Latin America, containing audio recordings of ceremonial chants and photographs made in the 1950s.
Wai Wai (Intercontinental Dictionary Series)

Languages of Brazil
Cariban languages
Languages of Guyana